is a 2004 French-German-Spanish Western comedy film directed by Philippe Haïm. It was inspired by the characters The Daltons in the comic Lucky Luke. It was filmed in France, Germany, and Spain. It was released 8 December 2004.

The comic had previously inspired several films, in particular  (1978). The film's budget of $26 million makes it one of the most expensive non-English language films.

The film was presented at the 7th Almería Western Film Festival on October 11, 2017.

Plot
Joe and Averell are respectively the oldest and youngest of the four Dalton brothers, the most dangerous bandits in the history of the Far West, and their failures are of such calibre that their own mother is turning against them.

But they react when Mama Dalton kicks them out of their own home and they decide to make her proud of them by robbing the Gulch City Bank, where security is so high that even employees are trained in martial arts. They fail in the robbery of the bank and Joe and Averell, along with their brothers, are imprisoned.

In the cell, they meet a Mexican who reveals information about a magic hat that makes him invincible. Joe immediately decides to get the hat, so the four brothers run away from prison and head for Mexico, leaving chaos in their wake. Arguing non-stop, Joe and Averell compete for power in a small town and manage to infiltrate a gang of criminals, where, after a spectacular battle, they steal the magic hat from the bandit who had it. But the problems are only beginning because of the constant and growing rivalry between Joe and Averell and the fact that the law is on their heels. Again in Gulch City, the brothers will try to rob the bank again and get their mother to be proud of them.

Cast

 Éric Judor: Joe Dalton
 Ramzy Bedia: Averell Dalton
 Saïd Serrari: Jack Dalton
 Romain Berger: William Dalton
 Til Schweiger: Lucky Luke
 Marthe Villalonga: Ma Dalton
 Javivi: El Tarlo
 Sylvie Joly: Ma Billy
 Ginette Garcin: Ma James
 Marie-Pierre Casey: Ma Cassidy
 Elie Semoun: Doxey
 Michel Muller: bank director
 Jean Benguigui: Mexican village chief
 Kad Merad: Mexican prisoner
 Jean Dujardin: Cowboy
 Darry Cowl: Old Timer

References

External links
 

2000s Western (genre) comedy films
2004 films
Films based on Belgian comics
French Western (genre) comedy films
Lucky Luke films
Films shot in Cologne
Live-action films based on comics
Films shot in Almería
2004 comedy films
2000s French films